Pedrazzini is an Italian surname. Notable people with the surname include:

Fabrizio Pedrazzini (born 1979), Italian ice dancer
Giuseppe Pedrazzini (1879–1957), Italian luthier
Luigi Pedrazzini (footballer) (born 1909), Italian footballer
Massimo Pedrazzini (born 1958), Italian footballer and manager
Mauro Pedrazzini (born 1965), Liechtenstein politician

Italian-language surnames
Surnames from given names